The Trainers' Championship currently rebranded as the Trainers' Judgement Night is a competition for the leading greyhound trainers in the United Kingdom.

History
The competition was inaugurated in 1977 at (Brough Park) and is contested by the six leading trainers based on points gained from open race success from the previous year.

The competition should not be confused with the Greyhound Trainer of the Year which is awarded to the trainer who achieves the most points for winning open races on the Greyhound Board of Great Britain annual racing calendar. The 2020 edition was cancelled due to the COVID-19 pandemic and when it returned in 2021 it was rebranded as the Trainers' Judgement Night following sponsorship by Arc & Entain. The new format was similar but saw a reduction from eight races to six.

Past winners

Sponsors
2021 (Arc/Entain)
2022 (Premier Greyhound Racing)

References

Greyhound racing competitions in the United Kingdom
Recurring sporting events established in 1977